Meryle Secrest  is an American biographer, primarily of American artists and art collectors.

Biography
Secrest was born in Bath, England, and educated at the City of Bath Girls School, a city-run grammar school strong in the arts and Humanities. Her family emigrated to Canada, where she began her career as a journalist. She worked as women's editor for the Hamilton News in Ontario, Canada; shortly thereafter she was named "Most Promising Young Writer" by the Canadian Women's Press Club. After marrying an American in 1964, she began writing for The Washington Post, doing profile interviews of notable personalities from Leonard Bernstein to Anaïs Nin.

In 1975, she left the Post to write books full-time. Since then she has written a number of biographies; her subjects have included Frank Lloyd Wright, Lord Duveen, Stephen Sondheim, Leonard Bernstein, Salvador Dalí, Kenneth Clark, Bernard Berenson, Romaine Brooks, Richard Rodgers, and Amedeo Modigliani. Her autobiography is entitled Shoot the Widow.

She lives in Washington, D.C.

Awards and recognition
Secrest's Being Bernard Berenson was a finalist for the Pulitzer Prize in 1980 and for the American Book Awards in 1981. In 1999, she received the George Freedley Memorial Award of the American Library Association for her outstanding contribution to the literature of the theatre. In 2006, she received the Presidential National Humanities Medal from President George W. Bush at the White House for illuminating the lives of great architects, artists and scholars of the 20th century.

Books
Between Me and Life: A Biography of Romaine Brooks, 1974. 
Being Bernard Berenson, 1979. 
Kenneth Clark: A Biography, 1984. 
Salvador Dalí, 1986.
Frank Lloyd Wright: A Biography, 1992. 
Leonard Bernstein: A Life, 1994.
Stephen Sondheim: A Life, 1998.
Somewhere for Me: A Biography of Richard Rodgers, 2001. 
Duveen: A Life in Art, 2004.
Shoot the Widow: Adventures of a Biographer in Search of Her Subject, 2007
Modigliani: A Life, 2011
Elsa Schiaparelli, 2014
The Mysterious Affair at Olivetti: IBM, the CIA, and the Cold War Conspiracy to Shut Down Production of the World’s First Desktop Computer, 2019

References

External links
Library of Congress bio 
Transcript of an interview by NEH chief Bruce Cole
Meryle Secrest Papers. James Marshall and Marie-Louise Osborn Collection, Beinecke Rare Book and Manuscript Library, Yale University.
 

American biographers
Living people
National Humanities Medal recipients
Year of birth missing (living people)
English emigrants to Canada
American autobiographers
American art historians
Women art historians